Harald Sverdrup may refer to:

 Harald Sverdrup (oceanographer) (Harald Ulrik Sverdrup, 1888–1957), Norwegian oceanographer and meteorologist
 Harald Ulrik Sverdrup (engineer) (1846–1916), Norwegian engineer
 Harald Sverdrup (writer) (Harald Ulrik Sverdrup, 1923–1992), Norwegian poet and children's writer
 Harald Ulrik Sverdrup (politician) (1813–1891), Norwegian priest and politician